Luka Rakić (born 2 August 1991) is a Montenegrin sprinter who specializes in the 200 meters. He participated for Montenegro at the 2011 World Championships in Athletics. He holds multiple Montenegrin records in athletics. He has been called the "pearl" of Montenegrin athletics by his country's press.

Running career
Rakić made his major international debut at the 2011 World Championships in Daegu, South Korea. He finished second to last in the men's 200 meters. At the 2014 European Team Championships, Rakić placed second overall in the Third League men's 100 meters.

Competition record

References

Montenegrin male sprinters
Living people
1991 births
World Athletics Championships athletes for Montenegro
Athletes (track and field) at the 2015 European Games
European Games competitors for Montenegro